RVmagnetics, a. s. is a research and development company based in Slovakia that specializes in manufacturing and customisation of contactless MicroWire based sensor technology for the industry 4.0, medical and biomedical technologies, electric motors, composites, construction and civil engineering, transportation and logistics. Sensor directly measures temperature, pressure and magnetic field, indirectly also other physical quantities such as stress, torsion, bending, movement, vibration, flow, electric current, position in the magnetic field etc.

History

The company was founded in 2015 by Rastislav Varga, Professor at Pavol Jozef Šafárik University in Košice and member of the European Magnetism Association. More than two thirds of the company's staff are members of the R&D team with the primary focus on customising MicroWire technology.

Services

Scope of their work basically lays in prototyping and customisation. The main focus of the company is on MicroWire sensing technologies that can be used where contactless sensing is of essence – due to size constraints, rotary movement of devices etc.

Usage of technology

Based on microwire technology and magnetic fields, the sensor is capable of sending real time data regarding physical quantities. Sensors are suitable for adapting IIoT (industrial internet of things), allow nondestructive testing and structural health monitoring and can be embedded into many materials without changing the materials’ properties. RVmagnetics technology allows one to obtain signal from the microwire from 10 cm away, even through the layers of various materials including metal, composite materials, concrete, human tissue, wood etc.

References 

Sensor manufacturers
Companies based in Košice
Companies of Slovakia
Technology companies of Slovakia
Slovak brands